Strowan is an affluent suburb of Christchurch, New Zealand, located approximately 5 km north-west of Christchurch's central business district. It had a population of 3,705 at the 2013 census. It is located between the suburbs of Merivale (South of Leinster Road), Papanui (North-East of Blighs Road), Bryndwr (North-West of Blighs Road, Idris Road (North of Jeffreys Road)), Fendalton (South-West of Idris Road (South of Jeffreys Road)), and St Albans (East of Papanui Road).

The area is predominantly residential, containing mostly parks and schools and few retail or commercial buildings. A small shopping centre exists at the intersection of Wairakei and Normans Roads, in the centre of the suburb. There is a private hospital located in the south-eastern corner of Strowan near the border of Merivale, called St. George's Hospital. The main train line north of Christchurch runs through the western part of the suburb - crossings exist on Blighs, Wairakei and Glandovey Roads.

Most of the suburb's housing is large and expensive, with a generally older architecture than many newer areas of Christchurch. There was little earthquake damage in Strowan after the 2011 Christchurch earthquake.

St George's Hospital, opened in 1928 and now one of New Zealand's largest private hospitals, is at 249 Papanui Road.

Demographics

Strowan had a population of 3,507 at the 2018 New Zealand census, an increase of 108 people (3.2%) since the 2013 census, and a decrease of 138 people (-3.8%) since the 2006 census. There were 1,275 households. There were 1,707 males and 1,803 females, giving a sex ratio of 0.95 males per female. The median age was 43 years (compared with 37.4 years nationally), with 690 people (19.7%) aged under 15 years, 615 (17.5%) aged 15 to 29, 1,611 (45.9%) aged 30 to 64, and 594 (16.9%) aged 65 or older.

Ethnicities were 91.4% European/Pākehā, 6.9% Māori, 1.4% Pacific peoples, 5.8% Asian, and 1.7% other ethnicities (totals add to more than 100% since people could identify with multiple ethnicities).

The proportion of people born overseas was 20.7%, compared with 27.1% nationally.

Although some people objected to giving their religion, 48.8% had no religion, 44.3% were Christian, 0.1% were Hindu, 0.3% were Muslim, 0.7% were Buddhist and 1.8% had other religions.

Of those at least 15 years old, 1,026 (36.4%) people had a bachelor or higher degree, and 264 (9.4%) people had no formal qualifications. The median income was $40,000, compared with $31,800 nationally. The employment status of those at least 15 was that 1,380 (49.0%) people were employed full-time, 483 (17.1%) were part-time, and 72 (2.6%) were unemployed.

Education
Waimairi School is a contributing primary school catering for years 1 to 6. The school opened in 1914 as Blair's Road School and was renamed Waimairi School in 1920.

Heaton Normal Intermediate is an intermediate school catering for years 7 to 8. Heaton was established as a boys' school in 1948, and became coeducational in 1953.

St Andrew's College is a private Presbyterian composite school catering for years 1 to 13. It opened as a boys' school in 1917 and became coeducational in 1991.

All these schools are coeducational. Rolls are as of

References

Suburbs of Christchurch